Sharpe's Fortress is the third historical novel of the Richard Sharpe series, by Bernard Cornwell, first published in 1998. It is the last of the Sharpe India trilogy. It tells the story of Ensign Sharpe, during the battle of Argaum and the following siege of the fortress of Gawilghur in 1803.

Plot summary

In 1803, Arthur Wellesley's British and sepoy army is in pursuit of the Mahrattas in western India, having beaten them in the Battle of Assaye. Ensign Richard Sharpe, newly made an officer, is beginning to wish he had remained a sergeant, as most of his fellow officers look down upon him, including Captain Urquhart, his commanding officer. Urquhart suggests he sell his commission if he is not happy.

Manu Bappoo, the younger brother of the Rajah of Berar, decides to turn around and fight the British again, with his best unit, composed of Arab mercenaries, leading the charge, but he is again routed. During the fighting, Sharpe is impressed by the bravery of a teenage Arab boy, Ahmed, and saves his life when the boy is surrounded. Ahmed becomes his servant.

After the battle, Urquhart recommends Sharpe transfer to the 95th Rifles, an experimental unit, though nothing can be done while the war rages on. For the moment, he assigns Sharpe to assist Captain Torrance, in command of the baggage train. The army is short of many desperately needed supplies, and Sharpe soon discovers why. Lazy and deeply in debt, Torrance has been selling them to the merchant Naig, with the assistance of Sharpe's old nemesis, Sergeant Hakeswill. When Sharpe finds many of the stolen supplies in Naig's tent, Torrance has his associate hanged immediately to avoid being implicated. Jama, Naig's brother, is not pleased, so Torrance agrees to betray Sharpe into his hands. Hakeswill is only too glad to waylay Sharpe; besides their mutual hatred, he rightly suspects that Sharpe has a fortune in jewels looted from a dead enemy ruler.

Hakeswill ambushes Sharpe and takes him prisoner. He steals all of the jewels Sharpe has hidden on his person, then hands him over to Jama. Fortunately, Ahmed witnesses Sharpe's kidnapping and gets away. By chance, he runs into Sharpe's friend, Syud Sevagee. Sevagee frees Sharpe. Sharpe decides to let his enemies believe he is dead. Using this ruse, he catches Captain Torrance alone and kills him.

The Mahrattas take refuge in Gawilghur, a seemingly impregnable fortress perched high on cliffs above the Deccan Plain. Wellesley, despite his deep misgivings, has no choice but to attack. Gawilghur is composed of an Outer Fort and an Inner Fort. While the Outer Fort is formidable, the Mahrattas expect the British to take it, though at heavy cost. However, the Inner Fort is so strong, they are confident it cannot fall. Once Wellesley's army has been bled dry trying to capture it, the Mahrattas plan to emerge and destroy the survivors.

When two of Hakeswill's henchmen are killed, Hakeswill realises Sharpe is responsible, so he deserts and finds service with the renegade Englishman William Dodd in Gawilghur. It is said that whoever rules in Gawilghur, rules India, and Dodd intends for it to be him. When the Outer Fort falls, Dodd keeps the gates of the Inner Fort closed, trapping Manu Bappoo outside to be killed by the British. Dodd also has Hakeswill murder Beny Singh, the weak, pleasure-loving commander of Gawilghur.

Sharpe finds a way into the Inner Fort. One section of the wall is weakly defended because it sits atop a steep cliff. The cliff, however, can be scaled. When Captain Morris, Sharpe's commanding officer, refuses to give him men, Sharpe beats him, then takes charge and leads a group of soldiers over the wall and opens the gates. He then finds and duels with Dodd, only to find that Dodd is by far the better swordsman. It is Dodd who gives Sharpe the scar on his right cheek. Ahmed appears unexpectedly and attacks Dodd. Dodd kills him easily, but Sharpe's cavalryman friend shoots him in the shoulder, and Sharpe kills him.

Hakeswill tries to flee, disguised as a British soldier, but Sharpe finds him. Sharpe retrieves his stolen jewels and other loot, then backs Hakeswill up until he falls into a pit filled with poisonous snakes.

Characters
Richard Sharpe – an ensign in the British Army
General Sir Arthur Wellesley – commander of the British in India
Sgt. Obadiah Hakeswill – Sharpe's former sergeant and ongoing nemesis
Major William Dodd – renegade East India Company officer
Ahmed – Sharpe's trusty Arab helper
Syud Sevajee – leader of Mahratta forces allied with the British and Sharpe's old friend. Sevajee seeks revenge against his father's murderer, Beny Singh, the nominal commander of Gawilghur.

Releases
19 November 1998, UK, HarperCollins , 19 November 1998, hardcover (first edition)
1 March 1999, UK, HarperCollins , audio book cassette
? November 1999, UK, Chivers Audio Books , audio book CD
6 March 2000, UK, HarperCollins , paperback
? June 2005, USA, HarperTorch , paperback
18 April 2006, UK, HarperCollins , paperback (TV tie-in)

External links
Section from Bernard Cornwell's website on Sharpe's Fortress

1998 British novels
Fortress
Fiction set in 1803
Novels set in Maharashtra
Second Anglo-Maratha War
HarperCollins books